Roman Mykolayovych Debelko (born 8 August 1993) is a Ukrainian football midfielder who plays for Kryvbas Kryvyi Rih.

Career
Debelko is a product of the FC Prykarpattya and FC Metalurh Donetsk youth sportive schools.

Honours
Shakhtyor Soligorsk
 Belarusian Premier League: 2021

Riga
 Latvian Higher League: (2) 2019, 2020

Levadia Tallinn
 Estonian Supercup: 2018

References

External links

1993 births
Living people
Ukrainian footballers
Association football midfielders
FC Metalurh Donetsk players
FC Stal Kamianske players
FC Urartu players
FC Karpaty Lviv players
FCI Levadia Tallinn players
Riga FC players
FC Shakhtyor Soligorsk players
FC Kryvbas Kryvyi Rih players
Ukrainian Premier League players
Ukrainian First League players
Meistriliiga players
Latvian Higher League players
Belarusian Premier League players
Armenian Premier League players
Ukrainian expatriate footballers
Expatriate footballers in Armenia
Ukrainian expatriate sportspeople in Armenia
Expatriate footballers in Estonia
Ukrainian expatriate sportspeople in Estonia
Expatriate footballers in Latvia
Ukrainian expatriate sportspeople in Latvia
Expatriate footballers in Belarus
Ukrainian expatriate sportspeople in Belarus
Sportspeople from Ivano-Frankivsk Oblast